The Sivuch'i Rocks (Ostrova Sivuch'i Kamni) are a group of barren islets and rocks on the eastern side of Uda Gulf, in the western Sea of Okhotsk.

Geography
They lie just north of Medvezhy Island. Reefs fringe the group.

History
American whaleships and boat crews cruised for bowhead whales around the rocks between 1855 and 1874. They called them the Sugar Loaf or Pinnacle Rocks. On the night of 11 October 1858, the bark Ocean Wave (380 tons), under Captain Hiram Baker, of New Bedford, was wrecked on one of the rocks during a gale. All hands were lost.

References

Shantar Islands
Shipwrecks in the Sea of Okhotsk